Café-Concert at Les Ambassadeurs (French - Le Café-concert aux ambassadeurs) is a monotype pastel by Edgar Degas of the cafe-concert at the Les Ambassadeurs restaurant. It was first exhibited in 1877 at an Impressionist exhibition and is now in the Musée des Beaux-Arts de Lyon. A later non-monotype version from 1885 is now in the Musée d'Orsay.

References

Pastel drawings by Edgar Degas
1877 paintings
Drawings of the Musée d'Orsay
Drawings of the Museum of Fine Arts of Lyon
Musical instruments in art